Mohamed Hansal (born November 6, 1947 in Oran) is a retired Algerian football referee. He refereed one match in the 1990 FIFA World Cup in Italy.

External links
Referee profile - World Referee

1945 births
Algerian football referees
FIFA World Cup referees
1990 FIFA World Cup referees
Living people
People from Oran
AFC Asian Cup referees
21st-century Algerian people